Xiangheyuan Subdistrict  is a township-level division situated in Chaoyang District Beijing, China. In the year 2020, it has a total population of 43,002.

The subdistrict was named after Xiangheyuan Road within it.

History

Administrative Division 

At the end of 2021, there are 9 communities within the subdistrict:

See also
List of township-level divisions of Beijing

References

Chaoyang District, Beijing
Subdistricts of Beijing